The 2000 Shell Championship Series was an Australian motor racing series open to V8 Supercars. The championship, which was the second Shell Championship Series, began on 11 February at the Phillip Island Grand Prix Circuit and ended on 19 November at the Mount Panorama Circuit after 13 rounds. Titles were awarded for drivers, teams and manufacturers by the series organisers AVESCO (Australian Vee Eight Supercar Company), and the winning driver, Mark Skaife, was also awarded the Australian Touring Car Championship by the Confederation of Australian Motor Sport, the 41st time that this title had been awarded.

Teams and drivers
The following drivers and teams competed in the 2000 Shell Championship Series.

* = Drove in the OzEmail Queensland 500 only

** = Drove in the FAI 1000 only

Driver Changes
Rodney Forbes left Lansvale Racing Team to join Gibson Motorsport
Jason Bright left Stone Brothers Racing to join Dick Johnson Racing as an endurance co-driver for the Bathurst 1000.
Dick Johnson retired from full time driving and joined Steven Johnson for the Queensland 500.
Steven Johnson replaced his father Dick Johnson who retired from full time driving.
Brad Jones left Larkham Motorsport to join Brad Jones Racing.
Wayne Gardner left Wayne Gardner Racing to join Glenn Seton Racing for the Bathurst 1000.
Paul Morris left Holden Racing Team to join Paul Morris Motorsport.
Cameron McConville left John Faulkner Racing to join Rod Nash Racing.
Paul Dumbrell left John Faulkner Racing to join Rod Nash Racing for Bathurst.

Team Changes
Stone Brothers Racing expanded to a two car team.
John Faulkner Racing scaled down to a one car team.
Rod Nash Racing expanded to a two car team.

Calendar
The 2000 Shell Championship Series was contested over 13 rounds.

Points system
Points were awarded for the first 20 places in each race as follows:

Results

Drivers Championship

Champion Team of the Year

 Holden Racing Team

The title was awarded to the team of the winning driver in the championship.

Champion Manufacturer

 Holden

The title was presented to the manufacturer with the most number of round wins in the championship.

See also
 2000 Australian Touring Car season
 2000 Konica V8 Lites Series

References

Further reading
 Jason Parker, 2000 Review, Mark of a Champion, Motor Racing Australia, Dec 2000/Jan 2001, pages 24–34

External links
 Official V8 Supercar site
 2000 Racing Results Archive
 2000 V8 Supercar Awards

Shell Championship Series
Supercars Championship seasons

sv:V8 Supercar 2000